Sura (Suriya), was an ancient city on the Euphrates River in northern Syria, today on a site 25 km west of Raqqa and 35 km north of Resafa. In the Roman Empire, Sura was a fortress city in the Roman province of Syria, and later on, in the Euphratensis.

In the 3rd century, Sura was a marginal attachment to the Strata Diocletiana to protect it against the Parthians. According to the Notitia dignitatum, Sura was the seat of the Prefect of the Legio XVI Flavia Firma. The legionary camp was located in the city and the city wall (1700 × 450 meters) was renewed under Justinian.

Bishopric 

Sura became a Christian bishopric, a suffragan of the metropolitan see of Hierapolis Euphratensis, the capital of the Roman province of Syria Euphratensis, as witnessed by a 6th-century Notitia Episcopatuum. At the Council of Chalcedon in 451, metropolitan bishop Stephanus signed the acts also on behalf of Bishop Uranius of Sura. Bishop Marius of Sura was deposed in 518 for joining the Jacobites.

No longer a residential bishopric, Sura is now listed by the Catholic Church as a titular see.

References

Bibliography
 Nigel Pollard: Soldiers, Cities, & Civilians in Roman Syria. University of Michigan Press, Ann Arbor 2000, . S. 295–296.
 Michaela Konrad: Der spätrömische Limes in Syrien. Archäologische Untersuchungen an den Grenzkastellen von Sura, Tetrapyrgium, Cholle und in Resafa. Resafa 5. Zabern, Mainz 2001.

Roman sites in Syria
Former populated places in Syria
Catholic titular sees in Asia